Fredrik Guttormsen Lærum Winsnes (born 28 December 1975) is a Norwegian former professional footballer who played as a midfielder, primarily for Rosenborg BK in the Norwegian Premier League. He also played 19 games for the Norway national football team.

Career
Born in Trondheim, Winsnes started his senior career with local team Rosenborg in 1996. He played nine seasons at Rosenborg, winning seven Norwegian Premier League championships and two Norwegian Cups. Though playing for Rosenborg until the end of 2005, he spent the 2002 season on loan at Swedish team Hammarby IF. In December 2005, he signed a three-year long deal with Aalborg Boldspilklub (AaB) in the Danish Superliga. He joined the AaB squad on 4 January 2006 during the training for the second half of the 2005–06 Superliga season.

He played one and a half season at AaB, helping them win bronze medals in the 2006–07 Superliga season; the best AaB result in eight years. After the season, he was named 2006-07 AaB Player of the Year. Having played a total 57 games and scored five goals for AaB, the birth of his daughter prompted Winsnes and his wife to move back to Norway to be closer to their family. He continued his career at Strømsgodset. August 20, 2008 he made a comeback on the Norwegian national team in a friendly match against Ireland, almost five years since his last match for Norway. After the 2009 season Winsnes returned to Rosenborg in his hometown Trondheim.

Career statistics

Honours

Club
Rosenborg
 Norwegian Premier League Champion (8): 1997, 1998, 1999, 2000, 2001, 2003, 2004, 2010
 Norwegian Cup Win (2): 1999, 2003

Individual
 AaB Player of the Year: 2006–07

References

External links
 AaB profile
Career stats at Danmarks Radio

1975 births
Living people
Footballers from Trondheim
Norwegian footballers
Norway international footballers
Ranheim Fotball players
Rosenborg BK players
Hammarby Fotboll players
AaB Fodbold players
Strømsgodset Toppfotball players
Eliteserien players
Danish Superliga players
Allsvenskan players
Norwegian expatriate footballers
Expatriate men's footballers in Denmark
Expatriate footballers in Sweden
Association football midfielders